Knödel — dumplings
 a type of juniper-flavoured spirit or Wacholder